The Complete Book of Humanoids is a sourcebook for the second edition of the Advanced Dungeons & Dragons fantasy adventure role-playing game.

Contents
The book's primary goal was to provide guidelines for several races to be used as player characters which were normally considered only "monsters".

The races dealt with in this book include: aarakocra, alaghi, beastman, bugbear, bullywug, centaur, fremlin, giant-kin (firbolg), giant-kin (voadkyn), gnoll, gnoll (flind), goblin, hobgoblin, kobold, lizard man, minotaur, mongrelman, ogre, half-ogre, orc, half-orc, pixie, satyr, saurial, swanmay, and wemic.

Publication history
The Complete Book of Humanoids was written by Bill Slavicsek for TSR. Published in 1993, the editing was by Jon Pickens, black and white art by Doug Chaffee, and color art by Chaffee, Sam Rakeland, Thomas Baxa, and Clyde Caldwell.

Reception
Mike Lampman reviewed The Complete Book of Humanoids in Shadis #9 and said that "overall, the Humanoid handbook is a good investment if you're an AD&D player, or GM, looking to spice up your campaign by playing something a little out of the ordinary. It's well written, and edited, as most of the TSR products are, and is laid out nicely."

Rick Swan reviewed The Complete Book of Humanoids for Dragon magazine #205 (May 1994). Swan considered the book a "major shake-up in the AD&D rules," as the Player's Handbook only allowed players to choose from six player character races, while this book expands the number of race options by 20. He notes that the book imposes restrictions to maintain game balance: "PCs can't be undead, nor can they be monsters taller than 12 feet. Centaur wizards can't go beyond 12th level; goblins can't be wizards at all." Swan also notes the difficulties involved in playing non-standard races, citing having a member of a typically evil race functioning in a lawful good society, or how very tall characters might navigate areas with low ceilings. However, he felt that adventurous players would appreciate the book, and closed the review by saying, "Who could pass up the chance to play a pixie?"

Trenton Webb of the British RPG magazine Arcane asserts that the shaman class from this book consists of "pilfered priests spells and mumbo jumbo".

An article by James Wyatt in Dragon #250 (August 1998) presented rules for playing various aquatic races, including crabmen, koalinth, locathah, malenti, merfolk, pahari, selkies, and vodyanoi in the same format used in The Complete Book of Humanoids. Wyatt acknowledged that "The Complete Book of Humanoids broke a long-standing barrier in the AD&D game by allowing players to make characters of nearly any humanoid race," and noted that the book carefully balanced such advantages such as great physical strength against substantial disadvantages, mostly in the form of prejudice and superstition from the more common races. Player characters based on the creatures presented in this article would face the same sort of prejudices, as well as special physical limitations when trying to interact with surface dwellers.

References

Further reading
 Reviews: White Wolf #38 (1993)

Dungeons & Dragons sourcebooks
Role-playing game supplements introduced in 1993